Wilson Township is one of eight townships in Audrain County, Missouri, United States. As of the 2010 census, its population was 1,633.

History
Wilson Township was established in 1837. The township has the name of Daniel Wilson, a pioneer settler.

Geography
It contains one cemetery, Skull Lick.

The streams of Big Branch, Goodwater Creek, Hitt Branch, Mayes Branch and Possum Walk Creek run through this township.

References

 USGS Geographic Names Information System (GNIS)

External links
 US-Counties.com
 City-Data.com

Townships in Audrain County, Missouri
Townships in Missouri